Taipidon is a genus of small air-breathing land snails, terrestrial pulmonate gastropod molluscs in the family Charopidae.

Species 
Species within the genus Taipidon include:
 Taipidon anceyana
 Taipidon marquesana
 Taipidon octolamellata

References

 GBIF: Taipidon species info

 
Gastropod genera
Molluscs of Oceania
Charopidae
Taxonomy articles created by Polbot